A North American Championship is a top level international sports competition between North American athletes or sports teams representing their respective countries or professional sports clubs.

List of Championships 

Bridge
 North American Bridge Championships

Debate
 North American Debating Championship

Figure skating
 North American Figure Skating Championships

Orienteering
 North American Orienteering Championships

Sailing
 Snipe North American Championship
 Soling North American Championship

Wrestling
 NWA North American Heavyweight Championship
 NWA North American Tag Team Championship
 NWF North American Heavyweight Championship
 NXT North American Championship
 Stampede North American Heavyweight Championship
 WWC North American Tag Team Championship
 WWC North American Heavyweight Championship
 WWF North American Heavyweight Championship

See also 

 Championship
 World championship
 African Championship
 Asian Championship
 European Championship
 Oceanian Championship
 Pan American Championship
 List of Pan American Championships
 Canadian Championships
 South American Championship

References 

Sports competitions in North America